All That I Wanted – Acoustic EP is the debut EP by New Zealand singer-songwriter Jamie McDell. It features acoustic renditions of "You'll Never Take That Away", "Rewind", and three other original songs. It was released digitally via iTunes through EMI Music New Zealand on 4 May 2012.

Promotion
As McDell is highly interactive with her fans (whom she affectionately refers to as "Gypsy Pirates"), the EP was promoted via Facebook with McDell posting lyrics, guitar tabs, behind-the-scenes video diaries, photos, competitions, and invitations to showcases and premiere parties. Fans were also encouraged to purchase the EP on iTunes to win handcrafted and framed lyrics made by Jamie herself.

Chart performance
The EP debuted and peaked on the Top 20 New Zealand Albums chart (which features albums by New Zealand artists) at No. 8, on 14 May 2012. The album dropped to No. 17 the following week and spent a total of three weeks on the chart.

Music videos
Music videos featuring McDell performing each track in various beach locations were created and uploaded to her YouTube channel.

Track listing

Personnel
 Jamie McDell – vocals, guitar, piano
 Chaz Rabble – engineering and mixing
 Edward Castelow – engineering and mixing

References

2012 debut EPs
Jamie McDell albums